Hemipsocidae is an insect family of Psocodea (formerly Psocoptera) belonging to the infraorder Psocetae. Members of the family have the areola postica joined to the M vein by a crossvein, and their M vein is two-branched. This family comprises twenty-four species in three genera: Anopistoscena, Hemipsocus, and Metahemipsocus.  They are commonly known as leaf litter barklice.

References

 Lienhard, C. & Smithers, C. N. 2002. Psocoptera (Insecta): World Catalogue and Bibliography. Instrumenta Biodiversitatis, vol. 5. Muséum d'histoire naturelle, Genève.

Psocoptera families
Psocetae